Carden Aero Engines Limited was a 1930s British fixed-wing aero-engine manufacturer, based at Heston Aerodrome.

History
Sir John Carden established the company in March 1936, while the Flying Flea craze was sweeping Britain. He saw a need for a cheap low-powered propulsion unit for ultralight aircraft. The engine was an adaptation of the well-proven and reliable Ford 10 Model C motor car engine.

Following the death of Sir John in an air accident in December 1935, the company was taken over by Carden-Baynes Aircraft Ltd, and later sold to Chilton Aircraft Ltd, Chilton Foliat, near Hungerford, Berkshire.

Engines
Carden-Baynes Auxiliary
The Carden-Baynes Auxiliary engine, as used on the Scud III Auxiliary sailplane, was a 2.5 hp Villiers air-cooled two-stroke, capacity 350 cc.
Carden-Ford 31 hp 4-cyl
A much modified Ford 10 car engine.
Carden-Ford S.P.1
Further development of the 31 hp engine, with a centric supercharger, 1.1:1 gear ratio, splined propeller shaft extension and horizontal mounting for flush wing mounting. Used exclusively on the Carden-Baynes Bee.

Aircraft using Carden engines
Aircraft that have used the Carden-Ford 31 hp engine are: Broughton-Blayney Brawney, B.A.C. Drone, Kronfeld Monoplane, Mignet HM.14 (Flying Flea), Perman Parasol, Taylor Watkinson Dingbat, and Chilton D.W.1 Monoplane.

See also 
Aerospace industry in the United Kingdom

Notes

References
Jackson, A.J.J. 1974. British Civil Aircraft, Vol.1. Putnam 
Lumsden, Alec. British Piston Engines and their Aircraft. Marlborough, Wiltshire: Airlife Publishing, 1994.

External links
contemporary advert in Flight magazine

Aerospace companies of the United Kingdom
Defunct manufacturing companies of the United Kingdom
Defunct aircraft engine manufacturers of the United Kingdom
Manufacturing companies established in 1935
British companies established in 1935
1935 establishments in England